The Wei or Weishui River, begins in Weishan Township, is  long, and has a drainage basin of . It is the largest river in Ningxiang City and one of the largest tributaries of the Xiang River.

Wei River's main tributaries include Huangjuan River, Duan River, Mei River, Tiechong River, Yutang River, Chu River and Wu River. The river passes places such as Huangcai Town, Hengshi Town, Shuangfupu Town, Dachengqiao Town, Batang Town, Huilongpu Town, Baimaqiao Township, Yutan Town, Lijingpu Township, and Shuangjiangkou Town, and empties into the Xiang River in Wangcheng District.

References

External links

Rivers of Changsha
Geography of Ningxiang
Wangcheng District